The following is a list of notable deaths in April 1998.

Entries for each day are listed alphabetically by surname. A typical entry lists information in the following sequence:
 Name, age, country of citizenship at birth, subsequent country of citizenship (if applicable), reason for notability, cause of death (if known), and reference.

April 1998

1
Theodore Bloomfield, 74, American conductor, heart attack.
Gene Evans, 75, American actor, heart failure.
Anne Gullestad, 72, Norwegian actress and theatre director.
Janusz Nasfeter, 77, Polish film director, screenwriter and writer.
Lucille Norman, 76, American actress, mezzo-soprano and radio personality.
Robert Ogle, 69, Canadian Roman Catholic priest and politician.
Mary Wynne Warner, 65, Welsh mathematician.
Rozz Williams, 34, American singer, poet and artist, suicide by hanging.

2
Joan Austin, 95, British tennis player.
Dai Davies, 88, Welsh trade unionist.
Ronnie Dix, 85, English football player.
Hans Eberle, 72, German football player.
Jock Gaynor, 68, American television actor and producer.
Eberhard Rees, 89, German-American rocketry pioneer and NASA executive.
Jackie Sardou, 78, French actress.

3
Mary Cartwright, 97, British mathematician.
Elmer Iseler, 70, Canadian choir conductor and choral editor.
Givi Kartozia, 69, Georgian middleweight Greco-Roman wrestler and Olympic champion.
Charles Lang, 96, American cinematographer (Some Like It Hot, A Farewell to Arms, Sabrina), Oscar winner (1934), pneumonia.
Harkisan Mehta, 69, Indian author and journalist, heart attack.
Rolf Olsen, 78, Austrian actor, screenwriter and film director, cancer.
Roby Pilatus, 32, German model, dancer and singer (Milli Vanilli), accidental overdose.
Herbert B. Powell, 94, United States Army general and diplomat.
John W. Sweeterman, 91, American newspaperman.
Alvin Tyler, 72, American R&B and jazz musician.
Wolf Vostell, 65, German painter and sculptor.

4
Harry Wesley Bass Jr., 71, American businessman, coin collector and philanthropist.
George Berry, 84, Australian politician.
Kate Bosse-Griffiths, 87, German-British egyptologist.
Marshall Fredericks, 90, American sculptor.
Kay Hughes, 84, American actress.
Pierre Lantier, 87, French composer and pianist.
Predrag Milinković, 64, Serbian actor.
Ian Percival, 76, British politician.
Ganesh Prasad Rijal, 77, Nepali politician, heart attack.

5
Frederick Charles Frank, 87, British theoretical physicist.
Mick Miller, 61, Australian Aboriginal activist and politician, heart seizure.
Elizabeth Mitchell, 79, New Zealand fencer.
Cozy Powell, 50, English rock drummer (Rainbow, Whitesnake, Emerson, Lake & Powell, Black Sabbath), car crash.

6
Edgar Ablowich, 84, American athlete and Olympian.
Reuben Berry, 63, American gridiron football coach.
Rudy Dhaenens, 36, Belgian road bicycle racer, car accident.
Helen Craig McCullough, 80, American academic, translator and japanologist.
Heinz Neuhaus, 71, German boxer and heavyweight champion.
Dewey Soriano, 78, American baseball executive.
Wendy O. Williams, 48, American singer, songwriter, and actress, suicide by gunshot.
John Wyatt, 63, American baseball player, heart attack.
Tammy Wynette, 55, American country music singer-songwriter, heart arrhythmia, heart attack.

7
Muhammad Karam Shah al-Azhari, 79, Pakistani Islamic scholar.
Modesta Bor, 71, Venezuelan composer.
Luis Díez del Corral, 86, Spanish jurist, writer and political scientist.
Vitaly Galkov, 58, Soviet and Russian sprint canoer and Olympian.
Sirous Ghayeghran, 36, Iranian football player and, traffic collision.
John Kasper, 69, American Ku Klux Klan member and segregationist.
Ronald William John Keay, 77, British botanist, cancer.
Pancho Magalona, 77, Filipino actor, emphysema.
Nick Auf der Maur, 55, Canadian journalist and politician, esophageal cancer.
James McIntosh Patrick, 91, Scottish painter.
Paul Sarringhaus, 77, American gridiron football player.
Alex Schomburg, 92, Puerto Rican comic-book artist and painter.
Carlos Vega, 41, Cuban-American session drummer, suicide.
S. V. Venkatraman, 86, Indian actor, singer and music director.

8
Anatole Dauman, 73, French film producer.
Charlie Drinkwater, 83, English football player and manager.
Lee Elias, 77, British-American comics artist.
Florence Virginia Foose Wilson Mayberry, 91, American writer and Baháʼí Faith convert.
René Pellos, 98, French artist, cartoonist and writer.
Kurt Weinreich, 89, German football manager.

9
Tom Cora, 44, American cellist and composer, malignant melanoma.
Mihai Grecu, 81, Moldovan painter.
Vishnu Bhikaji Kolte, 89, Indian writer.
Lü Shuxiang, 93, Chinese linguist, lexicographer and educator.
Ronald Vernon Southcott, 79, Australian medical zoologist.
Aleksey Spiridonov, 46, Soviet athlete and Olympic medalist.
John Tate, 43, American heavyweight boxer, car accident.
David Vigor, 58, Australian politician, heart attack.

10
Archbishop Serafim of Athens, 84, Greek archbishop.
Alan Burgess, 83, English RAF pilot and author.
Jean Chapot, 67, French screenwriter and film director.
Campos de Carvalho, 81, Brazilian writer.
Dieter Erler, 58, German footballer.
Basil James, 77, American jockey.
Zezé Moreira, 90, Brazilian footballer and coach.
Nguyen Co Thach, 76, Vietnamese revolutionary, diplomat, and politician.

11
Lillian Briggs, 65, American rock 'n roll musician, lung cancer.
Francis Durbridge, 85, English playwright and author.
Tex Geddes, 78, Scottish author and adventurer.
Rodney Harvey, 30, American actor, model and dancer, drug overdose.
Kristaq Rama, 66, Albanian sculptor, art educator and politician.
Ivan Tcherepnin, 55, French-American composer.
Rover Thomas, 72, Aboriginal Australian artist.

12
Xin Fengxia, Chinese pingju opera performer, cerebral hemorrhage.
Robert Ford, 83, Canadian poet and diplomat.
Dorothea Jameson, 77, American cognitive psychologist, lung cancer.
Frederick Lenz, 48, American businessman and spiritual teacher, suicide by drowning.
Felicitas Mendez, Puerto Rican-American civil right activist, heart failure.
Bruno Rodzik, 62, French football player.
Charles Sibley, 80, American ornithologist and molecular biologist.
Marvin Wolfgang, 73, American sociologist and criminologist.

13
Alec Albiston, 80, Australian rules footballer and coach.
Patrick de Gayardon, 38, French skydiver and skysurfing pioneer, skydiving accident.
Nyta Dover, 70, Swiss actress.
Bahi Ladgham, 85, Tunisian politician and Prime minister.
Ian MacGregor, 85, Scottish-American metallurgist and industrialist.
Pat Rainey, 72, American singer and actress.

14
Jake Colhouer, 76, American gridiron football player.
Weldon Humble, 76, American gridiron football player.
Harry Lee, 90, British tennis player.
Dorothy Squires, 83, Welsh singer, lung cancer.
Maurice Stans, 90, American civil servant and politician, congestive heart failure.

15
William Congdon, 86, American painter.
Pompeo D'Ambrosio, 81, Italian-Venezuelan businessman.
Kenny Duckett, 38, American football player (New Orleans Saints, Dallas Cowboys), renal failure.
William K. Jones, 81, United States Marine Corps lieutenant general.
Rose Maddox, 72, American country singer-songwriter.
Pol Pot, 72, Cambodian politician.

16
Kazimieras Antanavičius, 60, Lithuanian economist and politician.
Djibo Bakary, 76, Nigerian nationalist and politician.
Alberto Calderón, 77, Argentinian mathematician.
Fernande Caroen, 77, Belgian freestyle swimmer and Olympian.
Fred Davis, 84, English snooker and billiards player.
Marie-Louise Meilleur, 117, Canadian supercentenarian, oldest living person at the time of her death.
Ronald Millar, 78, English actor, scriptwriter, and dramatist.

17
Michael Ashikodi Agbamuche, 77, Nigerian Attorney General and politician.
Alberto Bovone, 75, Italian cardinal of the Catholic Church.
Frances Clark, 93, American pianist, pedagogue, and academic.
Geraldo de Barros, 75, Brazilian painter and photographer.
Linda McCartney, 56, American musician, photographer and animal rights activist, breast cancer.
William C. Scott, 76, Canadian politician.

18
Stoffel Botha, 69, South African politician, heart attack.
Ferenc Deák, 76, Hungarian football player.
William Edmondson, 91, American sound engineer.
Nelson Gonçalves, 78, Brazilian singer and songwriter, heart attack.
Johan Richter, 73, Danish architect and engineer.
Terry Sanford, 80, American university administrator and politician, esophageal cancer.
Linda Schele, 55, American Mesoamerican archaeologist, pancreatic cancer.

19
Gardner Dickinson, 70, American golfer.
J.C. Harrington, 96, American historical archaeologist.
Denis Howell, Baron Howell, 74, British politician.
Octavio Paz, 84, Mexican diplomat and writer, Nobel Prize laureate, cancer.
Vladimir Sokolov, 70, Russian scientist.
Liam Sullivan, 74, American actor and singer, heart attack.

20
Severo Cominelli, 82, Italian football player.
Trevor Huddleston, 84, English Anglican bishop.
Yoshio Inaba, 77, Japanese actor (Seven Samurai), heart attack.
Alfredo Palacio Moreno, 85, Ecuadorian sculptor and painter.
Othmar Wessely, 75, Austrian musicologist and university teacher.

21
Ivan Chtcheglov, 65, French political theorist, activist and poet.
Peter Lind Hayes, 82, American vaudeville entertainer, songwriter and actor, vascular problems.
Vernon Holland, 49, American gridiron football player (Cincinnati Bengals, Detroit Lions and New York Giants), heart attack.
Egill Jacobsen, 87, Danish painter.
Jean-François Lyotard, 73, French philosopher and sociologist, leukemia.
Gábor Preisich, 88, Hungarian architect.
Bruno Roth, 86, German racing cyclist.
Irene Vernon, 76, American actress, congestive heart failure and coronary artery disease.
Helen Ward, 84, American jazz singer.
Frank Wootton, 86, British aviation artist.

22
Edward Brongersma, 86, Dutch politician and doctor of law, voluntary euthanasia.
Kitch Christie, 58, South African rugby coach, leukemia.
Alfredo da Motta, 77, Brazilian basketball player.
Carlo Donida, 77, Italian composer and pianist.
Guy Henn, 88, Australian doctor and politician.
Vadym Hetman, 62, Ukrainian statesman and banker, murdered.
León Najnudel, 56, Argentine basketball player and basketball coach, leukemia.
Georges Paillard, 94, French cyclist.
Régine Pernoud, 88, French historian and archivist.
Shalimar Seiuli, 21, American-Samoan transgender dancer, accidental fall.
Marvin Worth, 72, American film producer, screenwriter and actor, lung cancer.

23
Konstantinos Karamanlis, 91, Greek politician and former Prime Minister and President.
James Earl Ray, 70, American convict and assassin of Martin Luther King Jr., liver failure.
Sartaj Singh, Indian Army general.
Red Stacy, 86, American gridiron football player.
Gregor von Rezzori, 83, Austrian-Romanian journalist, actor, writer and art collector.

24
Froduald Karamira, 50, Rwandan politician, execution by firing squad.
Yakov Malkiel, 83, Russian-American etymologist and philologist.
Mel Powell, 75, American composer and winner of the Pulitzer Prize, liver cancer.
Christiane Rochefort, 80, French feminist writer.
Leslie Stevens, 74, American producer, writer and director, angioplasty.

25
Jorge Dominichi, 51, Argentine football player and manager, heart attack.
Wright Morris, 88, American novelist, photographer and essayist, esophageal cancer.
Christian Mortensen, 115, Danish-American supercentenarian, Alzheimer's disease.
Don Petersen, 70, American playwright and screenwriter.
Stanley Brehaut Ryerson, 87, Canadian historian, educator, political activist.

26
Alan Boxer, 81, British Royal Air Force officer.
Juan José Gerardi Conedera, 75, Guatemalan Roman Catholic bishop and human rights activist, assassinated, homicide.
David Fasold, 59, United States Merchant Marine officer and salvage expert, cancer.
Gamini Jayasuriya, 73, Sri Lankan politician.
Sven Olov Lindholm, 95, Swedish anti-communist and nazi politician.
Gabe Paul, 88, American Major League Baseball executive.
Arif Pašalić, 54, Bosnian military officer, traffic collision.
Ivy May Pearce, 83, Australian aerobatic pilot.

27
John Bassett, 82, Canadian media proprietor and politician.
Carlos Castañeda, 72, American author, hepatocellular cancer.
Anne Desclos, 90, French journalist and novelist.
Edris Eckhardt, 93, American artist.
Louis S. Peterson, 75, American playwright, actor, screenwriter and professor, lung cancer.
Ralph Raphael, 77, British organic chemist, ischaemic heart disease.
Browning Ross, 74, American long-distance runner and Olympian.
Geoffrey Serle, 76, Australian historian.
Nguyen Van Linh, 82, Vietnamese revolutionary and politician, liver cancer.

28
Jerome Bixby, 75, American short story writer and scriptwriter.
Ramakant Desai, 58, Indian cricket player, complications following cardiac arrest.
Roger Eason, 79, American gridiron football player.
Dorothy Lovett, 83, American film actress.
Reed C. Rollins, 86, American botanist and professor.
Mum Shirl, 76, Australian Wiradjuri humanitarian activist.

29
Mary Castle, 67, American actress, lung cancer.
Charley Cowan, 59, American gridiron football player.
Mário de Castro, 92, Brazilian footballer.
Harold Devine, 88, American boxer.
V. Gopalakrishnan, Indian actor.
Hal Laycoe, 75, Canadian ice hockey player and coach.

30
Guy Anderson, 91, American painter.
Curly Chalker, 66, American pedal steel guitarist, brain tumor.
Lise Gervais, 64, Canadian abstract painter and sculptor.
Edwin Thompson Jaynes, 75, American physicist and statistician.
Nizar Qabbani, 75, Syrian diplomat, poet and publisher, heart attack.
Jopie Selbach, 79, Dutch freestyle swimmer and Olympian.

References 

1998-04
 04